Rotalidia comprises a class of Foraminifera where Foraminifera is regarded as a phylum, (Kingdom Protista or Rhizaria, not Chromista) that unites Foraminifera that have tests composed of secreted lamellar calcium carbonate, optically radial or granular calcite, or aragonite; separating them from those with porcelaneous, agglutinated, or microgranular, tests, or tests composed of organic compounds. Seven orders are included, the:

Rotaliida Delage & Hérouard, 1896 
Carterinida  Loeblich & Tappan, 1981 
Globigerinida  Delage & Hérouard, 1896 
Involutinida Hohenegger & Piller, 1977 
Lagenida Delage & Hérouard, 1896 
Silicoloculinida   Resig et al. 1980 
Spirillinida Hohenegger & Piller, 1975.

References

Biiolib Rotalidia

Foraminifera classes